Nick Blankenburg (born May 12, 1998) is an American professional ice hockey player for the Columbus Blue Jackets of the National Hockey League (NHL). He played college ice hockey at Michigan.

Early life
Blankenburg attended Romeo High School. During his senior year he was team captain and recorded 35 goals and 32 assists in 30 games, and helped lead the Bulldogs to their first state championship in school history in 2016.

Playing career

Junior
After graduating from Romeo in 2016, Blankenburg tried out twice for the North American Hockey League, but had no success. With a year left of eligibility for AAA hockey, he tried out for and made the Victory Honda 18U team in Plymouth, Michigan. During the 2016–17 season, he switched from forward to defense to fill a needed position on the team; a position he's stuck with ever since. He recorded ten goals and 18 assists in 32 games with Victory Honda.

From there, he was scouted by the Okotoks Oilers of the Alberta Junior Hockey League. For the 2017–18 season, Blankenburg played defense for the Okotoks Oilers, and recorded 16 goals and 26 assists in 57 games. While playing for Okotoks, Blankenburg caught the attention of scouts from his home school, University of Michigan, and received an offer to play college hockey.

Collegiate
Blankenburg began his collegiate career as a walk-on for the University of Michigan during the 2018–19 season. He scored his first collegiate goal on November 10, 2018, in a game against Notre Dame. He finished his freshman year with two goals and eight assists in 34 games. During the 2019–20 season in his sophomore year, he recorded four goals and 12 assists in 35 games. Following the season he was named Honorable Mention All-Big Ten. On July 10, 2020, Blankenburg was named an alternate captain for the 2020–21 season. During his junior year, he recorded five goals and eight assists in 26 games. He ranked sixth in the Big Ten Conference in defenseman scoring with 13 points, and ranked third in the Big Ten, and tenth nationally, in plus–minus at +19. Following the season he was named Honorable Mention All-Big Ten.

On September 16, 2021, he was named team captain for the 2021–22 season. After being a walk-on for his first three years, Blankenburg was also awarded a scholarship for the 2021–22 season. During his senior year, he recorded a career-high 14 goals and 15 assists in 38 games. On November 26, he scored a goal and an assist in a 4–0 win over Niagara. The next day against Niagara he recorded two goals and an assist in a 4–1 win, for his second consecutive multi-point game. He was subsequently named the Big Ten First Star of the Week for the week ending November 30, after recording five points during the weekend series. His 14 goals tied the Michigan program record for goals in a single season by a senior defenseman. He ranked second among all NCAA defensemen in goals and power play goals. Following the season he was named Honorable Mention All-Big Ten, and a finalist for the Senior CLASS Award. He also was awarded Michigan's Big Ten Medal of Honor. He finished his career at Michigan with 25 goals, 44 assists, a +52 with 10 power-play goals and three game-winning goals in 133 games.

Professional
On April 8, 2022, Blankenburg signed a one-year, entry-level contract with the Columbus Blue Jackets for the remainder of the 2021–22 NHL season. He made his NHL debut for the Blue Jackets on April 13, 2022. On April 24, in his sixth game, Blankenburg's first career NHL goal was the game-winning power play marker in a 5–2 victory against the Edmonton Oilers. On July 15, 2022, Blankenburg signed a two-year, $1.65 million extension with the Blue Jackets.

International play
On May 5, 2022, Blankenburg was named to the United States men's national ice hockey team to compete at the 2022 IIHF World Championship. He was scoreless in four games.

Personal life
Blankenburg's older brother, Alex, played college ice hockey for Omaha from 2015–19.

Career statistics

Regular season and playoffs

International

References

External links
 

1998 births
Living people
American men's ice hockey defensemen
Columbus Blue Jackets players
Ice hockey people from Michigan
Michigan Wolverines men's ice hockey players
Okotoks Oilers players
Undrafted National Hockey League players